Carl of Finland may refer to:
 Charles VIII of Sweden, interregnum County Lord of Finland
 Carl Gustav, Great Prince of Finland, son of King Gustav IV Adolf of Sweden (died young)